Jerzy Żurawlew (December 25, 1886October 3, 1980) was a Polish pianist, conductor, teacher, and founder of the International Chopin Piano Competition.

Life
Żurawlew was born at Rostov-on-Don in Russia in 1886. He studied with Aleksander Michałowski at the Warsaw Conservatory until 1913, and taught there himself from 1923. In 1916 he founded a music school in Minsk (now Belarus), and in 1920 one in Białystok.

He was the founder of the International Chopin Piano Competition, at Warsaw in 1927. His lifelong friend, Henryk Rewkiewicz - businessman, music lover and board member of The Warsaw Music Society - offered his personal financial guarantees to help get the Competition off the ground.

Żurawlew died in Warsaw in 1980, aged 93.

References

External links
Warsaw Chopin Competition website

Sources 
J. Methuen-Campbell, Chopin Playing From The Composer To The Present Day (Gollancz, London 1981).

Polish classical pianists
Male classical pianists
Polish music educators
Polish conductors (music)
Male conductors (music)
1886 births
1980 deaths
20th-century conductors (music)
20th-century classical pianists
20th-century male musicians